The Alberta Party, formally the Alberta Party Political Association, is a political party in the province of Alberta, Canada. The party describes itself as a centrist and pragmatic in that is not dogmatically ideological in its approach to politics.

History

Early history
The Alberta Party began in the early 1980s as an alliance of small separatist political parties. The right side of Alberta's political spectrum was fragmented by parties spawned in the wake of the National Energy Program and feelings that Premier Peter Lougheed had done little to prevent the economic collapse it allegedly had caused. Some of these parties had already achieved some small success in attaining seats in the Legislative Assembly of Alberta, though in the 1982 general election Social Credit, the Alberta Reform Movement and the Western Canada Concept lost their representation in the Legislature. The Heritage Party of Alberta, Representative Party of Alberta and the Confederation of Regions had been founded in the preceding years, which made for a total of five parties to the right of the Progressive Conservatives in 1985.

On October 30, 1990, this alliance of parties gave way to the creation of a new political party, the Alliance Party of Alberta. This change marked a transition away from trying to build a coalition of parties to full participation in electoral politics. The party participated in two by-elections, and fielded a handful of candidates in the 1993 general election but received only a small percentage of the popular vote in each case. The party did not contest the 1997 provincial election.

In 1998, the Alliance Party followed the example of the Saskatchewan Party and the Manitoba Party by changing its name to the Alberta Party Political Association, or the Alberta Party for short.

Shortly before the 2004 election, the Alberta Party attempted to merge with the Alberta Alliance Party (a different organization from the old Alliance Party of Alberta). The merged party would have adopted the Alberta Party platform, and the Alberta Party provincial council would have had seats on the Alberta Alliance Provincial Council. The deal fell through because the Alberta Party would not agree to de-register the Alberta Party name with Elections Alberta. On October 1, 2004, shortly before the general election, the party shortened its registered name to "Alberta Party" from "the Alberta Party Political Association".

In the 2004 provincial election, the party nominated candidates in four ridings, winning a total of 2,485 votes, or 0.3% of the provincial total. The party fielded one candidate, Margaret Saunter, for the March 3 2008 provincial election. Saunter placed last out of a field of six candidates in Edmonton-Centre.

Ideological shift and party renewal

After the rise of the Wildrose Alliance as Alberta's main right-wing alternative to the governing Progressive Conservatives, the right-wing members of the Alberta Party left to join that party. This left a small group of centrists in control of the party. In 2009, former Alberta Greens deputy leader Edwin Erickson, who had been organizing a new "Progress Party", was invited to run as a leadership candidate for the Alberta Party and won by acclamation. In 2010 the Alberta Party board voted to merge with Renew Alberta, a progressive and centrist group that had been organizing to form a new political party.

During the merger process, the party's board agreed to suspend its old policy platform and start anew. To create a new platform different from its more right-wing history, in 2010 the party launched a campaign called "The Big Listen" in order to canvass the public for new policy ideas. The party held its first policy convention on November 13 and 14, 2010 to develop substantive policies from the ideas heard during "The Big Listen". At the convention, Erickson stepped down to make way for an acting leader until a leadership contest could be held. A first set of policies was released on November 23, 2010, to coincide with the announcement of the appointment of an acting leader, Sue Huff. These policies centred on five key areas: economy, health, environment, democratic renewal, and education. On January 24, 2011, former Liberal MLA Dave Taylor announced he was joining the Alberta Party, becoming the party's first MLA.

2011 leadership election

The party announced in January 2011 that a leadership convention would be held in Edmonton on May 28, 2011. Four candidates contested the leadership of the party: Glenn Taylor, mayor of Hinton; Tammy Maloney, a social entrepreneur; businessman Randy Royer; and Lee Easton, chair of the English program at Mount Royal University. Chris Tesarski, CEO of Sandbox Energy Corporation, was also a candidate early in the contest, but on April 15 announced he would not seek the party's leadership, citing disagreements with some aspects of the party's philosophy and some party members' attitudes towards his candidacy. Dave Taylor, the party's only MLA, was also expected to run for the leadership, but did not join the campaign. At the convention, the election was decided on the first ballot when Glenn Taylor won just over 55% of the votes.

2012 Alberta general election
The party nominated 38 candidates to run in the 28th Alberta general election. None were elected.

2013 leadership election
After Glenn Taylor stepped down on September 22, 2012, the party remained without a leader for some months. On May 29, 2013, the party announced that it would be holding a leadership vote to coincide with its Annual General Meeting on September 21, 2013, in Edmonton. Entrepreneur and 2012 Calgary-Elbow election candidate Greg Clark, and self-employed consultant and 2012 Calgary-North West candidate Troy Millington, sought the leadership. Clark won the election, receiving 87% of the 337 votes cast.

2018 leadership election

A leadership election was triggered when Greg Clark stepped down as leader on November 18, 2017. The election was held on February 27, 2018, after originally being scheduled to be on February 7. Stephen Mandel became the new leader of the party after achieving 66% of the vote.

Floor Crossings 
On October 30, 2017, it was announced that former NDP MLA Karen McPherson who had left the Government Caucus earlier in the month would cross to join the Alberta Party as their third ever, and second current MLA. McPherson cited the need to make transformative change in healthcare and management of the economy, as well as the feeling that she could better advocate for her constituents and use her skills and abilities better in the Alberta Party.

In January 2018, former UCP MLA Rick Fraser announced that he would be joining the Alberta Party and running for its leadership race that had been triggered when Greg Clark stepped down. Fraser cited the divisive politics of the UCP for his departure, and the need to find "common sense policies" that "don't divide Albertans, but rather bring them closer together."

Fraser's joining of the Alberta Party tripled the caucus size from the results of the 2015 general election, leaving the Alberta Party as the third largest representation in the Legislature.

2019 Alberta general election

The Alberta Party ran a full slate of candidates for the first time. Although the party gained 9.09% of the popular vote, an increase from 2.29% in 2015, it lost all three ridings it held going into the election and won no seats in the Legislature.

2021 leadership election
On June 30, 2019, Stephen Mandel resigned as leader of the Alberta Party. Former PC MLA Jacquie Fenske became the interim leader on February 10, 2020. The Party announced a leadership contest, with a new leader to be elected on October 23, 2021. As only one candidate submitted a valid application by the close of nominations on August 31, 2021, Barry Morishita was acclaimed as leader.

Ideology 
For most of its history the Alberta Party was a right-wing organization, until the rise of the Wildrose Alliance as Alberta's main conservative alternative to the governing Progressive Conservatives attracted away the Alberta Party's more conservative members. This left a small rump of comparatively less conservative members in control of the Alberta Party. In 2010, the Alberta Party board voted to merge with Renew Alberta, a progressive group that had been organizing to form a new political party in Alberta. The Alberta Party thus shed its conservative past for a more centrist political outlook. The party has been cited in The Globe and Mail and The Economist as part of the break in one-party politics in Alberta, with the Economist calling it "a split in Canada’s most powerful right-wing political machine."

Leaders

Election results

By-elections

Notes

References

External links
 Alberta Party website

Organizations based in Edmonton
Political parties established in 1985
Provincial political parties in Alberta
1985 establishments in Alberta
Centrist parties in Canada
Social liberal parties
Populist parties